The cabinet of Greece, officially called the Ministerial Council, constitutes the Government of Greece. It is the collective decision-making body of the Hellenic Republic, composed of the Prime Minister and the Ministers. One or more Ministers may be appointed Vice President of the Government (Αντιπρόεδρος της Κυβερνήσεως, Deputy prime Minister), by decree initiated by the Prime Minister. Ministers are appointed by the President on the advice of the Prime Minister.

The Council defines and directs the general policy of the Country, in accordance with the provisions of the Constitution and the laws. It is regulated by the Constitution of Greece.

The Council meets at the building of the Maximos Mansion since July 2019. The meetings are chaired by the Prime Minister.

Formation of government
After the elections, the President appoints the Prime Minister and hands him the mandate to form a government. He suggests the new Ministers and Deputy Ministers and the new government gets appointed by the President in a swearing-in ceremony with the Archbishop of Athens at the Presidential Mansion in Athens.

Current cabinet

See also
List of cabinets of Greece

References

External links

 Greek Government official website
 General Secretariat on the Greek Government website
 Vice President on the Greek Government Website 

 
Greece, Cabinet